Never, Neverland is the second album by heavy metal band Annihilator. It was released on September 12, 1990, under the label Roadrunner. The album was re-released twice: in 1998 with three demo tracks as bonus tracks and again on September 9, 2003, in a two-disc compilation set along with Alice in Hell, entitled Alice in Hell/Never Neverland (as part of Roadrunner Records Two from the Vault series).

Reception

Nick Griffiths of Select gave the album a two-out-of-five rating, and described it as a "patchwork of half-fulfilled promises, it threatens more than it delivers." He noted that "only when the lead axe spits caterwauling speedplay and the thrash rhythm do Annihilator finally wash their true colours in public" and that "elsewhere there's a tendency to steer into formularised ruts, escaping occasionally like on the ghoulish riffs of 'Sixes and Sevens'."

Alex Henderson of AllMusic gave the album 4.5 stars out of 5, calling it "one of 1990's strongest metal releases".

Track listing

Credits
Band members
 Coburn Pharr – vocals
 Jeff Waters – guitars, bass, drum writing and arrangements, cover concept
 Wayne Darley – bass
 Ray Hartmann – drums
 Dave Scott Davis - guitar solos on tracks 1 and 8

Production
 Glen Robinson – co-producer, engineer, mixing
 Jeff Waters co-producer
 Steve Royea – engineer
 George Marino – mastering
 Victor Dezso, Mark Van Der Wielen – photography
 Nick Gilman – artwork, cover design
Len Rooney Creative – artwork
 Len Rooney – cover concept, cover design
 Monte Conner – executive producer
 Recorded February–April 1990 at Vancouver Studios, Vancouver, Canada
 mixed in April 1990 at Le Studio, Morin Heights, Quebec, Canada
 Mastered at Sterling Sound, New York City, U.S.
 Chris Gehringer – remastering
 Satoshi Kobayashi – reissue design

References

1990 albums
Annihilator (band) albums
Roadrunner Records albums